Marco Tejmer Larsen (born 15 May 1993) is a Danish retired football player who last played for Danish Superliga club FC Midtjylland. He has represented Denmark internationally at levels up to Denmark under-21.

References

 VB lejer Marco Larsen i FC Midtjylland, Vejle BK, 14 January 2016

External links
 Danish national team profile
 

1993 births
Living people
Danish men's footballers
Denmark under-21 international footballers
Association football midfielders
FC Midtjylland players
Danish Superliga players
People from Ringsted
Sportspeople from Region Zealand